The men's 3 metre springboard, also reported as springboard diving, was one of four diving events on the Diving at the 1984 Summer Olympics programme.

The competition was split into two phases:

Preliminary round (7 August)
Divers performed eleven dives. The twelve divers with the highest scores advanced to the final.
Final (8 August)
Divers performed another set of eleven dives and the score here obtained determined the final ranking.

Results

References

Sources
 

Men
1984
Men's events at the 1984 Summer Olympics